Culprate (real name: John Hislop) is a British electronic music producer, whose music ranges from IDM to dubstep. He established his role in the burgeoning UK dubstep scene by releasing EPs on Dubsaw Recordings and Inspected Records from 2010 to 2013. 

Around 2014, his music started to incorporate influences found in experimental rock music from bands like Radiohead and Pink Floyd. To release this music, he founded the label Open Outlets. At first, this was only used to release his own music, but ever since 2017, other artists have been allowed onto its roster.
On 29 November 2019, Culprate's crowdfunding page for a brand-new album on Indiegogo went live, promising to be a spiritual successor to his albums Colours and Deliverance, of which has a projected release date of July 2020. The album, entitled αριθμός τέσσερα, was eventually released in 2022.

Discography

Studio albums
Flatline (2011, Gradient Audio)
Colours (2011, Gradient Audio)
Deliverance (2014, Open Outlets)
αριθμός τέσσερα (2022, self-released)
Extended plays
Culprate / Suspect & Switchdubs - Don't Do That / Rotary (2009, Dubsaw Recordings)
Trench Foot / Flagrance (2010, Dubsaw Recordings)
Balkansky & Culprate - Sundrome / Android (2011, Dubsaw Recordings)
5 Star EP (2011, Inspected Records)
Nightmares In Reality EP (2012, Inspected Records)
The Great Expedition (2013, Inspected Records)
Mask (2015, Open Outlets)
Dawn (2017, Open Outlets)
Unity Project, Pt. 1 (2017, Open Outlets)
Unity Project, Pt. 2 (2017, Open Outlets)
Unity Project, Pt. 3 (2018, Open Outlets)
Unity Project, Pt. 4 (2018, Open Outlets)
Others (2018, Inspected)

References

British record producers
Musicians_from_Bristol